The men's freestyle 74 kilograms wrestling competition at the 2014 Asian Games in Incheon was held on 29 September 2014 at the Dowon Gymnasium.

This freestyle wrestling competition consisted of a single-elimination tournament, with a repechage used to determine the winner of two bronze medals. The two finalists faced off for gold and silver medals. Each wrestler who lost to one of the two finalists moved into the repechage, culminating in a pair of bronze medal matches featuring the semifinal losers each facing the remaining repechage opponent from their half of the bracket.

Schedule
All times are Korea Standard Time (UTC+09:00)

Results

Main bracket

Repechage

Final standing

References

Wrestling Database

External links
Official website

Wrestling at the 2014 Asian Games